Samuel Lee Green (born October 12, 1954) is an American former college and professional football player who was a linebacker in the National Football League (NFL) for five seasons during the 1970s and early 1980s.  He played college football for the University of Florida, and received All-American honors.  A second-round pick in the 1976 NFL Draft, Green played professionally for the Seattle Seahawks and the Houston Oilers of the NFL.

Early life 

Sammy Green was born in Bradenton, Florida in 1954.   He attended Fort Meade High School in Fort Meade, Florida, where he played high school football for the Fort Meade Miners.

College career 

Green accepted an athletic scholarship to attend the University of Florida in Gainesville, Florida, where he played for coach Doug Dickey's Florida Gators football team from 1972 to 1975.  Memorably, as a sophomore in 1973, Green forced a critical fumble by Auburn Tigers tailback Sullivan Walker, which led to a touchdown and the Gators' margin of victory in a 12–8 upset of the Tigers at home—the Gators' first-ever win at Jordan–Hare Stadium.  He was a team captain, a first-team All-Southeastern Conference (SEC) selection, and a consensus first-team All-American in 1975.  Green was inducted into the University of Florida Athletic Hall of Fame as a "Gator Great" in 2003.  In one of a series of articles published by The Gainesville Sun in 2006, the newspaper's sports editors ranked him as the No. 51 all-time greatest Gator among the top 100 players from the first century of the Florida football team.

While a student at Florida, Green was a member of Alpha Phi Alpha Fraternity (Theta Sigma Chapter).

Professional career 

He played in sixty-two NFL games in his five-season career, starting in forty-four of them.

Life after football 

Green completed his Master's Degree at Iowa State University, and as of 2010, is working to complete a Doctorate.  He Has now retired from Washington High School in Cedar Rapids, Iowa. He now teaches English and Composition at Skagit Valley College in Washington State as of 2022.

See also 

 1975 College Football All-America Team
 Florida Gators football, 1970–79
 List of Alpha Phi Alpha brothers
 List of Florida Gators football All-Americans
 List of Florida Gators in the NFL Draft
 List of University of Florida Athletic Hall of Fame members
 List of Seattle Seahawks players

References

Bibliography 

 Carlson, Norm, University of Florida Football Vault: The History of the Florida Gators, Whitman Publishing, LLC, Atlanta, Georgia (2007).  .
 Golenbock, Peter, Go Gators!  An Oral History of Florida's Pursuit of Gridiron Glory, Legends Publishing, LLC, St. Petersburg, Florida (2002).  .
 Hairston, Jack, Tales from the Gator Swamp: A Collection of the Greatest Gator Stories Ever Told, Sports Publishing, LLC, Champaign, Illinois (2002).  .
 McCarthy, Kevin M.,  Fightin' Gators: A History of University of Florida Football, Arcadia Publishing, Mount Pleasant, South Carolina (2000).  .
 Nash, Noel, ed., The Gainesville Sun Presents The Greatest Moments in Florida Gators Football, Sports Publishing, Inc., Champaign, Illinois (1998).  .

1954 births
Living people
All-American college football players
American football linebackers
Florida Gators football players
Houston Oilers players
Iowa State University alumni
Sportspeople from Bradenton, Florida
People from Fort Meade, Florida
Players of American football from Florida
Seattle Seahawks players